LBJ/Skillman station is a DART Light Rail and bus station in Dallas, Texas. It is located north of Interstate 635 (LBJ Freeway) between Skillman Street and Miller Road in North Dallas. This was a short-term northeastern Blue Line terminus until it was extended to Garland in November 2002.

References

External links 
 DART - LBJ/Skillman Station

Dallas Area Rapid Transit light rail stations in Dallas
Railway stations in the United States opened in 2002
2002 establishments in Texas
Bus stations in Dallas
Railway stations in Dallas County, Texas